Glutathione peroxidase 8 (GPx-8) is an enzyme that in humans is encoded by the GPX8 gene. GPx-8 is a member of the glutathione peroxidase family.

External links 
 PDBe-KB provides an overview of all the structure information available in the PDB for Human Glutathione Peroxidase 8 (GPX8)

References

EC 1.11.1
Antioxidants